Sparta High School is the primary high school in Sparta, Wisconsin. Its colors are red and gold and its sports team's name is the Spartans.

References

External links
Sparta Area School District

Public high schools in Wisconsin
Schools in Monroe County, Wisconsin